The Hampshire Open was an annual darts tournament held in May in Southampton. It is England's largest one day darts tournament with usually around 500 players.

Since the first event held in 2000, there have been 9 winners and only one player, Colin Monk has won the event on more than one occasion: he has won 3 times in 2003, 2008 and 2009. His son Arron won in 2010. The prize is £1000. Last tournament was held in 2017.

References

External links

Darts tournaments
Sport in Hampshire
2000 establishments in England
2017 establishments in England
Recurring sporting events established in 2000
Recurring sporting events disestablished in 2017